Mie & Kei ~Pink Lady Best Selection~ is a greatest hits album released by Japanese duo Pink Lady in 1996 to commemorate the duo's 20th anniversary. The album featured one new single, "Pink Eyed Soul", written by the duo.

Track listing 
Disc 1
 "UFO"
 
 "Pink Eyed Soul"
 
 
  (From the motion picture Happy)
 
 
 
 
 
 

Disc 2
 "Kiss in the Dark"
  (USA Version)
 
 
 "S.O.S."
 
 
 "OH!"

References

External links

1996 compilation albums
Pink Lady (band) compilation albums
Victor Entertainment compilation albums